This is the discography of South Korean hip hop group Epik High.

Albums

Studio albums

Compilation albums

Special albums

Remix albums

Extended plays

Singles

Other charted songs

Soundtrack appearances

Other works

Epik High

Tablo

DJ Tukutz

Mithra Jin

Music videos

Notes

References

External links 
Official sites:
  Epik High's Official Site
  WOOLLIM Entertainment's Official Site
 CJ Music's Official Site

Discographies of South Korean artists
Hip hop discographies
K-pop music group discographies